ecoATM, LLC, doing business as Gazelle, is an eCommerce company founded in 2006 that helps people donate used electronic devices, such as cellular phones, mobile phones, smart tablets and laptop computers . It is headquartered in San Diego, California with operations in Louisville, Kentucky.

History
Gazelle was founded in 2006 by Israel Ganot, Rousseau Aurelien, and James McElhiney. Gazelle.com launched in 2008 and raised $46 million in funding from Venrock, Rockport Capital, Physic Ventures and Craton Equity Partners.

The company's corporate office is located in San Diego, CA with more than 150 employees. In June 2013, the consumer electronics retailer opened its first processing center in Louisville, KY. The warehouse operates with about 150 employees. In 2013, the company topped $100 million in revenue, growing at a 80 percent rate. In November 2014, Gazelle launched a store to sell certified pre-owned devices direct to consumers.

Since launching, Gazelle has paid $200 million to consumers for used devices, and has accepted more than 2 million devices from more than 1 million customers.

On November 10, 2015 Gazelle's acquisition by Outerwall Inc., owner of ecoATM, another electronics recycler, became official.

In December 2020, Gazelle announced that its trade-in program would be shut down on February 1, 2021.

Recognition and awards
 Gazelle reached its two millionth gadget milestone in May 2014.
 In 2012, Gazelle ranked within the Inc. 500 Fastest Growing Companies for three years in a row.
 In 2012, Gazelle ranked as #97 the Top 100 Consumer Products & Services Companies, #16 in the Top 100 Massachusetts Companies, and #15 in the Boston Metro Area.

See also
Electronic waste in the United States

References

External links
Gazelle

Electronic waste in the United States
Software companies based in Massachusetts
Software companies of the United States
American companies established in 2006
Vending
2006 establishments in Massachusetts
Companies based in San Diego
Online companies of the United States